Mount Rogers is a large hill, with an elevation of , located in the northern suburbs of Canberra, within the Australian Capital Territory, Australia. There is a park called the Mount Rogers Reserve at the crest of the hill, and a trig point at the summit.

Location and features

Mount Rogers has several significant rocky outcrops around the area which are predominantly made up of dacite, indicating the area's volcanic past. Small boulders are also common and the soil is generally rocky and thin. The area contain approximately 50 two-hundred-year-old eucalypts. The stumps of even larger older trees indicate that, prior to European settlement, the landscape would have been an open grassy woodland. Many new trees and shrubs were planted in the early 1970s as the suburbs' houses were built around the rather treeless hill.

Regular walkers and other locals care about this  (approx.) piece of land and its bird, reptile, plant and mammal species, and this interest has promoted community spirit and monthly working bees. The area has a Landcare group, Mt Rogers Landcare, which has a blog where the groups' coordinator's newsletters are posted periodically.

Superb Parrots and Tawny Frogmouths have been regular (bird) visitors to Mt Rogers in recent years, as recorded on the blog and its pages.

Mt Rogers has been an off-lead dog space for forty years.  The off-lead aspect of Mt Rogers is most valued by the residents of the four suburbs bordering Mt Rogers.  The community is grateful for the opportunity to allow their dogs to walk freely and enjoy the socialisation of other dogs and people.

Etymology
Mount Rogers is named after John Core Rogers ( – 1971), who was the Commonwealth Surveyor General from 1949 to 1963. He also served on the Canberra Building Review Committee, was foundation president of the Canberra Division of the Institute of Surveyors and was instrumental in the formation of the National Mapping Council in 1945.

References

Mountains of the Australian Capital Territory